The women's 100 metres sprint event at the 1952 Olympic Games took place on July 21 and July 22.  The final was won by Australian Marjorie Jackson, who equalled the world record set in 1936 by Helen Stephens.

Results

First round
The first round was held on July 21. The first two runners of each heat qualified for the second round.

Heat 1

Heat 2

Heat 3

Heat 4

Heat 5

Heat 6

Heat 7

Heat 8

Heat 9

Heat 10

Heat 11

Heat 12

Quarterfinals
The first three runners from each heat qualified to the semifinals.

Quarterfinal 1

Quarterfinal 2

Quarterfinal 3

Quarterfinal 4

Semifinals
The first three runners from each heat qualified for the final. Fanny Blankers-Koen withdrew from the competition at this stage.

Semifinal 1

Semifinal 2

Final

References

Athletics at the 1952 Summer Olympics
100 metres at the Olympics
1952 in women's athletics
Women's events at the 1952 Summer Olympics